Aechmea macrochlamys is a plant species in the genus Aechmea. The species is endemic to the State of Espírito Santo in eastern Brazil.

Cultivar
 Aechmea 'Purple Globe'

References

macrochlamys
Flora of Brazil
Plants described in 1941